Kevin Maher (born 1972) is an Irish writer. He is primarily known as a journalist and chief film critic at The Times. His work has appeared in The Guardian, The Independent, and The Observer. His debut novel, The Fields, was published by Reagan Arthur Books in 2013.  It was listed in the 2013 Waterstones 11, a literary book prize aimed at promoting debut authors.

Early life
Maher was born in West Dublin, Ireland in 1972. His family was lower middle class catholics. His grandfather was a fighter in the Irish War of Independence in Tipperary. He graduated from the University College Dublin in 1994 with an MA degree in film. During his graduation, he wrote for university magazines.

Career
After graduating, Maher moved to London in 1994 to focus on journalism. Before starting his career as a film critic, he worked as a waiter for several years. He wrote for The Face and Time Out before joining The Times. He took a year off in 2001 after having his first child and in 2002, he first approached The Times to write for it. He joined the newspaper in 2004. Since then he has been writing reviews and weekly columns for it. He has interviewed directors including Spike Lee, Martin Scorsese, and Dennis Hopper. 

Maher worked as a researcher on the Channel 4 show Film Night. He also conducted an online course in film criticism for The Times.

Writing style
Maher believes that being true to oneself is an important trait for all young writers. In interviews, he has stated that he avoids writing reviews based on discussions with his peer critics, believing they should be written exclusively from one's own perspective. His reviews are often contrary to critical consensus.

Personal life 
Maher lives in Hertfordshire, England along with his three children and wife.

Bibliography
The Fields – 2013
Last Night on Earth – 2015

References

Irish writers
Living people
1972 births